Bert Davey (1921–2002) was a British art director.

Selected filmography
 Time Is My Enemy (1954)
 Devil's Point (1954)
 Stolen Time (1955)
 The Traitors (1962)
 On the Beat (1962)
 A Place to Go (1963)
 A Stitch in Time (1963)
 Carry on Cleo (1964)
 Carry On Cowboy (1965)
 Three Hats for Lisa (1965)
 The Big Job (1965)
 Carry on Screaming! (1966)
 Billion Dollar Brain (1967)
 Battle of Britain (1969)
 Toomorrow (1970)
 Zeppelin (1971)
 Penny Gold (1973)
 From Beyond the Grave (1974)
 The Land That Time Forgot (1975)
 Hennessy (1975)
 The Slipper and the Rose (1976)
 At the Earth's Core (1976)
 The First Great Train Robbery (1978)
 North Sea Hijack (1980)
 The Dogs of War (1980)
 Eye of the Needle (1981)
 Superman III (1983)
 Morons from Outer Space (1985)
 Aliens (1986)

References

Bibliography 
 Joseph A. Gomez. Ken Russell: The Adaptor as Creator. Muller, 1976.

External links 
 

1921 births
2002 deaths
British art directors
People from London